Addictive Aversions, by Alfredo de Palchi, is a book of erotic and anti-erotic poems written originally in Italian under the title Le Viziose Avversioni.

Summary
The book is a follow-up to Anonymous Constellation, about the destructive forces of nature. Addictive Aversions focuses instead on the life-force of sex -- just as blind, asocial and irresistible as nature.

Editions 
 Addictive Aversions, translated from Italian by Sonia Raiziss and others. Grand Terrace, CA: Xenos Books, (1999).   (paper), 138 p.

References

Italian poetry collections